Jason Edward Feddy (born 22 February 1966) is an English musician who now makes his home in Southern California, United States. In addition to a notable solo career as a singer/songwriter, Feddy has fronted several bands, as well as written and performed for television, movies, and the stage. Feddy has also had a successful run hosting his own radio show. In 2019 Feddy was named Laguna Beach "Artist of the Year."

Career
Feddy was born in the city of Leeds, Yorkshire, England. He left school at 16 and, after a couple of years drifting around Europe and the Middle East, returned to England and formed the rock 'n roll band Officer Dibble, which he fronted as a singer and guitar player. In 1984 he became lead singer of his first professional band, "Soft Target," working men's clubs in the UK's North East and touring Norway. Going solo as a singer/songwriter soon thereafter, he spent the next couple of decades touring and making albums, acquiring accolades and notoriety along the way. Feddy has been featured in the prestigious London based Time Out (magazine) and on the cover of the Classic Rock Society journal. He tours in Europe regularly to this day and has written songs for theater, television and film.

"By the time Jason Feddy starts, [its] not just standing room only, it’s breathing room only ... teaming hot, not just from shared body heat but shared anticipation ... Jason’s VOICE is just stunning, ... [a] high quality singer songwriting from a bloke who is a master, and knows his craft ...."

Mad Dogs & The Englishman
In the summer of 2018 Feddy debuted his Joe Cocker tribute band, "Mad Dogs & The Englishman". Along with Jason as lead singer (who had in years past toured with Joe Cocker), the band features an all-star lineup of musicians including John Troy on bass (who has performed or recorded with Vince Gill, John Denver, Amy Grant, Belinda Carlisle, The Mamas and the Papas, Jesse Colin Young, John Oates, The Nitty Gritty Dirt Band, Glenn Frey, Jack Tempchin and Honk); Ray Weston on drums (Iron Butterfly and touring or recording with Tom Jones, Robert Palmer, Bjork, Del Shannon, Right Said Fred, and many others); Richard Bredice on guitar (formerly with Jules Shear, Fall Out Boy, Common Sense); Dave Witham on keyboards (who has worked with Barbra Streisand, George Benson, Al Jarreau, José Feliciano, to name a few); Jimmy 'Z' Zavala on saxophone (who has toured and recorded with Rod Stewart, Tom Petty, Eurythmics, and has recorded with Dr. Dre, Barry White, Ziggy Marley, Carole King, Yes, Bon Jovi, Macy Gray, and countless others); and "The Chick" back-up signers Pat Hawk (formerly with Michael Bolton, John Denver, Bill Medley and The Righteous Brothers, Merry Clayton, Eric Carmen, Pet Shop Boys, Kenny G, Peabo Bryson, and more); Janis Leibhart (formerly with Michael Bolton 19 years), Moody Blues, Glenn Frey, k.d. lang, Charlie Rich, Englebert Humperdinck, and The Righteous Brothers), and Lori Mark-Heingold (formerly with The Righteous Brothers, Bill Medley, Engelbert Humperdinck, Eric Carmen, Merry Clayton, Charlie Rich, and was a featured singer on "The Dirty Dancing" Tour). The band opened to rave reviews: "We included Mad Dogs & The Englishman as part of our summer concert series. It was not only SOLD OUT but was one of the highlights of our year. Everyone was on their feet. It was an extraordinary performance. The band members were all top notch. Jason Feddy IS Joe Cocker!" — Susan Davis, Director of Special Events Festival of Arts, Laguna Beach, California. The band now regularly plays at numerous venues and events throughout the country.

Beatroots Band 
The Beatroots band was formed by Feddy in the spring of 2006 in response to a request from Laguna Beach's world-famous Festival of Arts (see Pageant of the Masters or Sawdust Art Festival). The Festival was looking for a band to play Beatles songs on their music stage every Sunday afternoon the following summer. They contacted Feddy, who brought the players together and formulated the show. The Beatroots are a different kind of "tribute" band. They don't dress up, they don't wear wigs. They play the songs of The Beatles in their own style, staying close to the original, but improvising when the feeling takes them. This makes for a truly energetic and alive experience for both the musicians and the audience. Not a dreary copy-cat, but a real, organic living tribute.

The Beatroots show was a tremendous success at the Festival of the Arts—it ran for six incredible years—and to this day the band continues to appear at the Festival and various other venues.

The Beatroots are: Jason Feddy (lead vocals and guitar); Geoff Perlman (vocals/guitars); John Troy (vocals/bass) and Evan Stone (drums).

133 Band
In 2014 Laguna Beach resident Clay Berryhill gathered together eight local musicians with big time musical careers, including Feddy as guitar player and singer, to create a new band modeled after the Traveling Wilburys, called the 133 Band. In addition to Feddy, the 133 Band features Beth Fitchett-Wood (guitar & vocals), Steve Wood (keyboards & vocals) Poul Pedersen (guitar & vocals), Bob Hawkins (lead guitar), Alan Deremo (bass), Nick Hernandez (ukulele, guitar & vocals), and Drew Hester (drums).

The 133 Band made its debut by opening for The Beach Boys at the Irvine Bowl and continues to appear at numerous venues in southern California. It has also produced an EP, a CD, and a documentary film about the making of the band and its members.

Theater, television, film
In 2018, Feddy wrote fourteen original songs for the play Two's a Crowd, including the hit single "If Only." The musical comedy, written and produced by award-winning comedienne Rita Rudner and her British producer husband Martin Bergman, opened at the Laguna Playhouse in September 2018, starring Rita Rudner and The Phantom of the Opera'''s Davis Gaines. Feddy also served as Musical Director for the opening run. The show opened a six-week off-Broadway run in New York City during the summer of 2019, with Feddy also appearing onstage and singing. A review by the New York Times described Feddy's show persona as "rumpled charm."

In 2017 Feddy co-narrated the short film "Everything Laguna Beach."

Feddy has written and performed songs for the Mary-Kate and Ashley Olsen TV series So Little Time, feature film Divorce Invitation (starring Paul Sorvino & Elliott Gould), and soundtrack for the documentary film "Home Again."

Shakespeare's Fool
There are songs in the plays of Shakespeare. In the spring of 2010, Feddy and his band met with local performance poet, actor and teacher John Gardiner, to develop a performance piece of Shakespeare's songs with modern, acoustic based tunes combined with speeches from Shakespeare's plays.

The result is a fast-paced, off the cuff and energetic performance called Shakespeare's Fool, featuring 10 songs and 10 speeches from the Shakespeare canon accompanied by performance art by Feddy's actress wife, Ava Burton. Feddy recorded the songs with his friends and musical collaborators David J. Carpenter (bass) and Bryan Head (drums).

Feddy also regularly performs Shakespeare's Fool live at local venues such as Rockpile Amphitheater at Heisler Park, overlooking Laguna Beach's Pacific Ocean lagoon. His songs were used in the 2018 Bares Bones Theater production of In Search of Silvia, Or What Goes Awry When Fools Fall in Love, by Lojo Simon.

Cantor
Feddy is a fluent Hebrew speaker and performs many popular and ceremonial songs. He currently serves the resident Cantor at Temple Isaiah in Newport Beach. He has also appeared at Temple Beth in San Diego, Temple West in La Jolla, Chabad of Laguna Beach, and Beth Hamidrash in the United Kingdom.

In 2016 Feddy teamed up with Rabbi-Cantor Marcia Tilchin, founder of The Jewish Collaborative of Orange County, to host a monthly musical Kabbalat Shabbat service.

Radio personality
Feddy began his radio career in 2013 with a Sunday morning show entitled "Full English Breakfast" on KXRN 93.5 FM in Laguna Beach. The show featured Feddy and his cousin Martyn Cohen (along with other sometimes co-hosts), bantering about with humorous chat on current events and life in general, in between playing groovy tunes.Itunes Podcasts. Itunes.com. Retrieved 10/7/2015.
Based upon the wild popularity of "Full English Breakfast," Feddy was invited to host his own daily show on 93.5 FM, something he described as "moonlighting during the day as DJ."Feddy on Twitter. www.twitter.com. Retrieved 10/7/2015. The show included music, news, sardonic comedy, and regular interviews of an eclectic group of celebrities such as Rick Springfield (actor & Grammy Award-winning musician), Cindy Williams (Laverne & Shirley), Eddie Money (rock musician), Ian Anderson (Jethro Tull), Teri Nunn (Berlin), Jim Kerr (Simple Minds), Lee Rocker (Stray Cats), Mike Green & Ray Weston (Iron Butterfly), Robbie Krieger (The Doors), and many others.Jason Feddy Podcasts. Stitcher.com. Retrieved 10/1/2015.

Following the huge success of Feddy's daily show, he teamed-up with DJ Tyler Russell to do a live morning show for 93.5 FM weekdays from 7–10 a.m. entitled "Daily Scramble Live" followed by an abbreviated version of his continuing daily show. "Daily Scramble Live" featured an invigorating blend of music, news, games, in-studio guests, and banter. Highlights included Daily Scramble News, the Only in Laguna File, Jason Sings the Police Blotter, Grab Bag of Games, and Let's Punk Newport.Daily Scramble Live. Kx935.com. Retrieved 10/4/2015. Soon thereafter he also assumed the role of 93.5 FM Director of Production & Promotion.

In March 2018 KX 93.5 made the following announcement: "Growth and change can be bittersweet. We are saddened to officially announce that Jason Feddy has elected to resign from KX 93.5 to pursue other opportunities. He has been an integral part of KX 93.5's history, and we wish him the best."

Venues/other artists
Over the years Feddy has played at various venues throughout the United Kingdom, Europe, the United States and Middle East, including the Royal Albert Hall in London, the London Palladium, Wembley Stadium, Glastonbury Festival, Harrogate Blues Bar, Laguna Beach Festival of the Arts, Laguna Beach Sawdust Art Festival, The Tudor House Theatre in Lake Arrowhead, Jacob's Ladder Festival in Israel, Chilkat Center for the Arts in Alaska, the Blue Water Music Festival in Laguna Beach, and many, many more."Welcome to the Parlor". The Mountain News. 30 July 2015.Hotel Laguna. www.hotellaguna.com. Retrieved 8/18/2015. Feddy has also appeared on MTV.

Feddy as a solo artist, or with various bands, has opened for or collaborated with such noted musical artists as Al Stewart, Donovan, The Beach Boys, Neil Young, Kenny Loggins, Joe Cocker, David Gray, Ben Folds Five, Patsy Matheson, The Cranberries, Tears for Fears, Ralph Covert, Christie Moore, Paul Young, John Martyn, Jools Holland, Chris de Burgh, and Lisa Loeb, to name but a few.Tradebit. www.tradebit.com. Retrieved 10/1/2015.

Laguna Playhouse
Feddy served as co-host for the sold out Laguna Concert Band featuring Lee Rocker at the Laguna Beach Playhouse.

In the summer of 2014 Feddy made his stage acting debut as a radio announcer in the Laguna Beach Playhouse presentation of Buddy—The Buddy Holly Story.

In December of 2017, 2018, and 2019, Feddy appeared at the Playhouse with the performance art group The Skivvies, performing stripped-down versions of eclectic covers, wacky holiday mash-ups and eccentric originals.

Sponsorships and endorsements
Feddy is sponsored by and officially endorses Rickenbacker guitars and Bose sound reinforcement systems.

Community service
Feddy is consistently involved in community service and support of charitable organizations. He has played the Blue Water Concert to Help Save Trestles, the InPerson Social Media fundraiser for Earthroots Field School, appeared at the Home Aid OC's Annual Project Playhouse Dinner & Auction to benefit for the homeless, and been featured at the Friendship Shelter Annual Gala, among others.Taylor Mathieson, "Friendship Shelter’s Annual Gala Raises Money for Homeless". Orange County Register. 8 November 2011.

Feddy spearheaded bringing the Music in Common program to Orange County (a two-day event which brings together high school age Jews, Christians, and Muslims to learn how to exchange ideas with mutual respect, collaborate, and work together towards a common goal through the process of writing a song)."Students of Different Faiths Find Common Ground in Music". Orange County Register. 9 December 2015. In 2018 Feddy became the Southern California Regional Coordinator for Music in Common.

Other
Feddy's chance encounter with British presenter, writer, journalist, and BBC television personality Richard Hammond is memorialized in Hammond's 2013 biography On the Road: Growing up in Eight Journeys-My Early Years (Weidenfeld & Nicolson): "Jason Feddy was incredible. An affable sort of a guy with a soft, reedy speaking voice bearing a distinct Northern twang, he relaxed and laughed with us. His long wavy hair under a stylish baker-boy cap atop an impossibly loud shirt signaled that her was a guy for whom his music was everything. He was a pro and we were there to learn."

English author, musician and screenwriter Jeremy Dyson (an acquaintance of Feddy's wife) uses the name "Jason Feddy" to represent a fictional character in his short story entitled "A Visit From Val Koran", appearing in the collection of short stories published in 2000 entitled Never Trust A Rabbit'' (Duck Editions).

Awards
In 2016, Feddy received the Laguna "Hero Fest" music hero award for his work with Music in Common.

In 2017, Feddy was recognized as a "Local Luminary" by Laguna Beach Magazine, an annual list of creators, champions and change-makers who have made a significant impact—near and far.

In 2017, Feddy was named the "Best of Laguna Beach" in a poll conducted by local radio station 93.5 FM.

In 2019, Feddy was named "Artist of the Year" by the Laguna Beach Arts Alliance.

Personal life
Feddy attended Leeds' Morris Silman Middle School in the United Kingdom, which provided a rounded Jewish and secular education and Bar-Mitzvah training. Feddy and his family were longstanding members of one of the many local synagogues. Feddy was a member of the school and synagogue choirs and was awarded 1st prize in the school's trophy for music in his last year at the school. Active for all of his childhood years in the Kibbutz oriented youth movement (Habonim Dror), Feddy was raised to the soundtrack of Jewish music, both ancient and modern. His mother was (and still is) an active member of various amateur choirs and liturgical singing groups. His father's side—not so musical—although he does account for Feddy's sense of humor and big personality!

Feddy graduated from Allerton High School, Leeds, United Kingdom, in 1982. Later he attended Manchester College, Manchester, United Kingdom, 1997-1998; and thereafter attended the University of Manchester, Manchester, United Kingdom, 1998-1999.

In 2010, Feddy married his sweetheart, classically trained actress Ava Burton, in Israel on Kibbutz Tuval, under a chuppah overlooking the Galilean hills. They make their home in Aliso Viejo with their beloved white poodle "Mrs. Pickles."

Discography

Albums
 Shakespeare's Fool (full band version) (2018)
 The Joy of OK (2013)
 Shakespeare's Fool (solo acoustic version) (2012)
 Live in Kevin's Garage (2010)
 Connected (2008)
 United Kingdom (2007)
 So Long Lives This EP (2006)
 So Long Lives This (2005)
 Is This Thing On? (2003)
 I Thought the Moon was Meant for Me (1996)
 Jason Feddy LP (1995)
 Fish on the Moon (1993)

Police Blotter compilations
 Police Blotter 2 (2017)
 Police Blotter (2016)

Notable songs
 A Brand New Dream (Feddy/Thomson)
 Afterglow (Feddy/Benstock)
 After You There Is No One (Feddy)
 All Fools Day (Feddy)
 All In This Together (Feddy)
 All That You Do To Me (Feddy/Scott)
 Angels (Feddy)
 Anything You Want (Feddy)
 Anyway (Feddy)
 Beautiful Few (Feddy)
 Bitch (Feddy)
 Blood Is Blood (Feddy/Carpenter)
 Breakdown from the Stars (Feddy)
 Cartoon Life (Feddy)
 Clearly a Blue Day (Feddy)
 Connected (Feddy/Carpenter)
 Drugs on Legs (Feddy)
 Diatribe (Feddy)
 Don't Ask Me How I Know (Feddy)
 Easily (Feddy)
 Even The Rain (Feddy/Scott)
 Everything Will Follow (Feddy/Dermo)
 Faces (Feddy/Thomson/Caine)
 Fish On The Moon (Feddy)
 Forty-Seven Days (Feddy)
 Friends For Life (Feddy)
 Get To The Sun (Feddy/Thomson)
 Green Lights (Feddy/Dermo)
 Gods in the Grain (Feddy/Hawkins)
 Heroin (Feddy)
 Hineni (Feddy)
 Hole In My Heart (Feddy)
 Home Again (Feddy/Hayes)
 Human Zoo (Feddy)
 I Can't Wait (Feddy/Hawkins)
 I Depend On You (Feddy/Clarke)
 I Just Remembered (Feddy/Barguiarena/Bunn)
 I Still Want You Now (Feddy)
 I Want Holding (Feddy/Thomson)
 If I Don't Ask (Feddy/Beal)
 Infinity (Feddy/Dermo)
 Katy's Car (Feddy/Thomson)
 Kicking Up The Pavement (Feddy/Scott)
 Let It Be Summer (Feddy/Thomson)
 Let Me Off The Leash (Feddy/Hall)
 Liar (Feddy)
 Man On A String (Feddy) 
 No Faith (Feddy)
 Oh (Feddy)
 Philistines (Feddy/Barrett)
 Ragtime To Rags (Covert)
 She Loves Everyone (Feddy)
 She's Coming Home (Feddy)
 She's Not To Blame (Feddy)
 Skandia's Song (Shafer/Feddy/Carpenter)
 Speechless (Feddy/Hawkins/Todd)
 Stars (Feddy)
 Starstruck & Spellbound (Feddy/Dermo)
 The Birds Will Sing Your Name (Feddy/Benstock)
 The Bridge To The Island (Feddy)
 The Deaf and Dumb Boy (Feddy)
 The Deed Was Done (Feddy)
 The Foolish Lover's Heart (Feddy)
 The Names Go On Forever (Feddy/Swimm/Getz)
 There's Only One Way This Could End (Feddy)
 The Road (Feddy)
 Wade Through the Water (Feddy/Dermo)
 Watching The Walls (Feddy)
 What If? (Feddy)
 Wilderness Of I Don't Know (Feddy)
 You're Gonna Have My Way (Feddy)

Police Blotter songs
 Grapes  (Feddy)
 Underwater Bicycle Man  (Feddy)
 Acid Kelp (Feddy)
 A Lexus  (Feddy)
 The Ballad of Eddie Rubio (Feddy)
 Frank Lee Russell, 49 (Feddy)
 Morningside Circle (Feddy)
 My Purple Helmet (Feddy)
 Drunk In Public (Feddy)
 Rock Scallop (Feddy)
 The Thousand Dollar Phone (Feddy) 
 One Red Door (Feddy) 
 Wheelie Boys (Feddy)
 A Better Class of Loser (Feddy)
 When I am Old and Tired (Feddy)
 Egged (Feddy)
 What's In A Name (Feddy)
 Fanny Pack (Feddy)
 Where's Granny? (Feddy)
 Florida (Feddy)
 Audi Blues (Feddy)
 Four Bananas (Feddy)
 Manhole (Feddy)
 Rifling (Feddy)
 The Library (Feddy)
 The Severed Head Of St. Vitalis (Feddy)
 Thank You Neighbor (Feddy)
 Grand Theft: Keys  (Feddy)
 You Can't Beat Kids (Feddy)
 Bad Ass Blotterees (Feddy)
 Guitar Stolen (Feddy)

Shakespeare's Fool songs (lyrics by Shakespeare/music by Feddy)
 All That Glisters
 Blessings On You
 Fear No More The Heat Of The Sun
 Hey Ho The Wind & The Rain
 How Should I Your True Love Know?
 O Mistress Mine
 Queen Of Queens
 Sigh No More, Ladies
 Sylvia
 The Gravedigger

Two's A Crowd songs
 Two's a Crowd
 Live a Little
 Getting There
 If Only
 Forgiveness
 Sh-t Happens

Movie and television songs
 Beautiful Few (Mary Kate & Ashley TV series "So Little Time" and compilation soundtrack CD)
 Easily (title track of the movie "Divorce Invitation" starring Paul Sorvino & Elliott Gould)
 Home Again (title song from the music-documentary "Home Again" in support of Home Aid, OC)
 I Still Want You Now Instrumental ("Divorce Invitation")
 I Just Remembered ("Divorce Invitation")

References

External links
Jason Feddy Official Website
KX93.5 Radio Website
Temple Isaiah Orange County Website

1966 births
Living people
Musicians from Leeds
English male singers
English male guitarists
English male singer-songwriters
English rock singers
English folk musicians